Four Days Wonder is a 1933 comedy mystery novel by the British writer A.A. Milne. A young woman obsessed with murder mysteries goes to visit her aunt at a country house, only to find her dead. Invigorated by the excitement she launches an investigation.

Film adaptation
In 1936 it was adapted into a film of the same title by the American studio Universal Pictures. Directed by Sidney Salkow it starred Kenneth Howell, Martha Sleeper and Alan Mowbray.

References

Bibliography
 Cohen, Nadia. The Extraordinary Life of A. A. Milne. Grub Street Publishers, 2017.
 Goble, Alan. The Complete Index to Literary Sources in Film. Walter de Gruyter, 1999.
 Haring-Smith, Tori. A.A. Milne: A Critical Bibliography. Garland, 1982. 
 Shaw, Bruce. Jolly Good Detecting: Humor in English Crime Fiction of the Golden Age. McFarland, 2013.

1933 British novels
Novels by A. A. Milne
British comedy novels
British mystery novels
British novels adapted into films
Novels set in England
Methuen Publishing books
Works set in country houses
E. P. Dutton books